The 2018–19 Premier League International Cup was the fifth season of the Premier League International Cup, a European club football competition organised by the Premier League for under-23 players. Bayern won the title by defeating Dinamo Zagreb 2–0 in the final.

Porto were the defending champions, after beating Arsenal 1–0 in the previous season's final, but were eliminated in the group stage.

Format
The competition featured twenty-four teams: twelve from English league system and twelve invitees from other European countries. The teams were split into six groups of four - with two English league clubs per group. The group winners, and two best runners-up, progressed into the knockout phase of the tournament. The knockout matches were single leg fixtures.

All matches - including fixtures between non-English teams - were played in England and Wales.

Teams
Athletic Bilbao, Benfica, Everton, Leicester City, PSV Eindhoven, Porto and Villarreal made their fifth appearance in the competition. They are the only teams to take part in every season since the tournament was founded in 2014.
Brighton & Hove Albion, Paris Saint-Germain and Southampton made their debuts.

English league system:
 Brighton & Hove Albion
 Derby County
 Everton
 Leicester City
 Liverpool
 Manchester United
 Norwich City
 Reading
 Southampton
 Tottenham Hotspur
 West Ham United
 Swansea City

Other countries:
 Bayern Munich
 VfL Wolfsburg
 Hertha BSC
 Athletic Bilbao
 Villarreal
 Porto
 Benfica
 PSV Eindhoven
 Feyenoord
 Paris Saint-Germain
 Dinamo Zagreb
 Sparta Prague

Group stage

Group A

Group B

Leicester City's match against Feyenoord was originally scheduled for 30 October 2018, however on 27 October 2018, Leicester City owner Vichai Srivaddhanaprabha's helicopter crashed outside the King Power Stadium shortly after taking off from the pitch, killing Srivaddhanaprabha and all four other people on board. The Feyenoord match was one of the club fixtures postponed as a result.

Group C

Group D

Group E

Group F

Ranking of second-placed teams

Knockout stages

Quarter-finals

Semi-finals

Final

References

2018-19
International Cup
2018–19 in European football
2018–19 in English football